William Croft Wilson (May 31, 1931 – November 6, 1963) was an American Congregational minister, and the namesake of Wilson Chapel at Central Congregational Church in Providence, Rhode Island.

He was born at Greenwich Hospital, the son of William Stavely Wilson and Winifred Graham Croft.  His father was an executive at Janney, Montgomery and Scott.

He graduated from Haverford College in 1954, and from Yale Divinity School in 1957.

He was ordained at Second Congregational Church in Greenwich, Connecticut, and served as minister at Central Congregational Church from 1957 until his death in 1963. His death was due to problems with his heart, and he was treated at Johns Hopkins Hospital by Dr. Helen Taussig.

References

Haverford College alumni
Yale Divinity School alumni
1931 births
1963 deaths
American Congregationalist ministers
20th-century Congregationalist ministers